Camisares (died 385 BC) was an Iranian, father of Datames, who was high in favour with the Persian Great King Artaxerxes II (404–358 BC), by whom he was made satrap of a part of Cilicia bordering on Cappadocia. He fell in Artaxerxes' war against the Cadusii in 385 BC, and was succeeded in his satrapy by Datames, his son by a Paphlagonian mother.

References

Sources 
  
 
 
  

4th-century BC Iranian people
385 BC deaths
Achaemenid satraps of Cilicia
Year of birth unknown